Dmitri Ivanovich Ivanov (1928 – 1993) was a Russian lightweight weightlifter. Between 1953 and 1954 he won one world and two European titles, and set four ratified world records: three in the press and one in the snatch.

References

1928 births
1993 deaths
Soviet male weightlifters
European Weightlifting Championships medalists
World Weightlifting Championships medalists